The 1989–90 Tercera División season is the 13th season since establishment the tier four.

League table

Group 1

Group 2

Group 3

Group 4

Group 5

Group 6

Group 6 North

Group 6 South

Promotion playoff

Relegation playoff

Group 7

Group 8

Group 9

Group 10

Group 11

Group 12

Group 13

Group 14

Group 15

Group 16

Group 17

External links
www.rsssf.com

1989-90
4
Spain